Roman Nohavica (born 1 March 1974) is a retired Czech football defender.

References

1974 births
Living people
Czech footballers
FC Baník Ostrava players
AFK Atlantic Lázně Bohdaneč players
SFC Opava players
FK Pardubice players
FC Viktoria Plzeň players
1. HFK Olomouc players
Czech First League players
Association football defenders